Cannes is a city located on the French Riviera. It is a commune located in the Alpes-Maritimes department, and host city of the annual Cannes Film Festival, Midem, and Cannes Lions International Festival of Creativity. The city is known for its association with the rich and famous, its luxury hotels and restaurants, and for several conferences.

History
By the 2nd century BC, the Ligurian Oxybii established a settlement here known as Aegitna. Historians are unsure what the name means. The area was a fishing village used as a port of call between the Lérins Islands.

In 154 BC, it became the scene of violent but quick conflict between the troops of Quintus Opimius and the Oxybii.

In the 10th century, the town was known as Canua. The name may derive from "canna", a reed. Canua was probably the site of a small Ligurian port, and later a Roman outpost on Le Suquet hill, suggested by Roman tombs discovered here. Le Suquet housed an 11th-century tower, which overlooked swamps where the city now stands. Most of the ancient activity, especially protection, was on the Lérins Islands, and the history of Cannes is closely tied to the history of the islands.

An attack by the Saracens in 891, who remained until the end of the 10th century, devastated the country around Canua. The insecurity of the Lérins islands forced the monks to settle on the mainland, at the Suquet. Construction of a castle in 1035 fortified the city by then known as Cannes, and at the end of the 11th century construction was started on two towers on the Lérins islands. One took a century to build.

Around 1530, Cannes detached from the monks who had controlled the city for hundreds of years and became independent.

During the 18th century, both the Spanish and British tried to gain control of the Lérins Islands but were chased away by the French. The islands were later controlled by many, such as Jean-Honoré Alziary and the Bishop of Fréjus. They had many different purposes: in the middle of the 19th century, one served as a hospital for soldiers wounded in the Crimean War.

Henry Brougham, 1st Baron Brougham and Vaux bought land at the Croix des Gardes and constructed the villa Eleonore-Louise. His work to improve living conditions attracted the English aristocracy, who also built winter residences.

At the end of the 19th century, several railways were completed, which prompted the arrival of streetcars. In Cannes, projects such as the Boulevard Carnot and the rue d'Antibes were carried out. After the closure of the Casino des Fleurs (hôtel Gallia), a luxury establishment was built for the rich winter clientele, the Casino Municipal next to the pier Albert-Edouard. This casino was demolished and replaced by the new Palace in 1979.

In the 20th century, new luxury hotels such as the Carlton, Majestic, Martinez, and JW Marriott Cannes were built. The city was modernised with a sports centre, a post office, and schools. There were fewer British and German tourists after the First World War, but more Americans. Winter tourism gave way to summer tourism, and the summer casino at the Palm Beach was constructed.

In 1931, Karan Singh the crown prince of Jammu and Kashmir was born at the Martinez Hotel.

The city council had the idea of starting an international film festival shortly after World War II.

On 3 November 2011, it hosted the 2011 G20 summit.

Climate
Cannes has a subtropical Mediterranean climate (Köppen climate classification Csa) and the city enjoys 11 hours of sunshine per day during summer (July), while in winter (December to February) the weather is mild. Both seasons see a relatively low rainfall and most rain occurs during October and November, when over  falls.

Temperatures remain high from June to September, the busiest time of the year.

Mean temperatures drop below  for only three months of the year (December to February). The spring and autumn are also warm, although more suited to those who prefer slightly cooler weather.

Population

Landmarks

The Promenade de la Croisette is the waterfront avenue with palm trees. La Croisette is known for picturesque beaches, restaurants, cafés, boutiques and luxury hotels. Le Suquet, the old town, provides a good view of La Croisette. The fortified tower and the Chapelle Sainte-Anne house the Musée des Explorations du monde. A distinctive building in Cannes is the Russian Orthodox church.

Hotels

Villas

Cannes of the 19th century can still be seen in its grand villas, built to reflect the wealth and standing of their owners and inspired by anything from medieval castles to Roman villas. They are not open to the public. Lord Brougham's Italianate Villa Eléonore Louise (one of the first in Cannes) was built between 1835 and 1839. Also known as the Quartier des Anglais, this is the oldest residential area in Cannes. Another landmark is the Villa Fiésole (known today as the Villa Domergue) designed by Jean-Gabriel Domergue in the style of Fiesole, near Florence, which may be visited on appointment.

Île Sainte-Marguerite 

It took the Man in the Iron Mask 11 years to leave the tiny, forested St Marguerite Island. The mysterious individual was believed to be of noble blood, but his identity has never been proven. His cell can be visited in the Fort of St Marguerite, now renamed the Musée de la Mer (Museum of the Sea). This museum also houses discoveries from shipwrecks off the island, including Roman (1st century BC) and Saracen (10th century AD) ceramics.

Île Saint-Honorat 

Cistercian monks are the only inhabitants of the smaller, southern St Honorat Island. Monks have inhabited the island since AD 410 and, at the height of their powers, owned Cannes, Mougins, and Vallauris. Medieval vestiges remain in the stark church, which is open to the public, and in the ruins of the 11th-century monastery on the sea shore. The monks inhabit the Lérins Abbey and divide their time between prayer and producing red and white wines.

Museums
The Musée d'Art et d'Histoire de Provence houses artifacts from prehistoric to present, in an 18th-century mansion. The Musée de la Castre has objects from the Pacific Atolls, Peruvian relics and Mayan pottery. Other venues include the Musée de la Marine, Musée de la Mer, Musée de la Photographie and Musée International de la Parfumerie.

Theatre and music
Cannes is not known for traditional theatre. However, small venues stage productions and host short sketches during the annual International Actors' Performance Festival. Local theaters include the Espace Miramar and the Alexandre III.

Festivals and show events

 The Cannes Film Festival founded in 1946 is held annually, usually in May, at the Palais des Festivals et des Congrès.
 The Cannes Lions International Festival of Creativity is a global event and awards show for those working in advertising and related fields, held annually in June.
The Festival d'art pyrotechnique de Cannes is an annual fireworks competition held in the summer at the Bay of Cannes.
 Midem, the foremost trade show for the music industry.
 MIPIM, the world's largest property-related trade show.
Carnival on the Riviera is an annual parade through the streets to mark the 21-day period prior to Shrove Tuesday.
The International Festival of Games is festival of bridge, belote, backgammon, chess, draughts, tarot and more (February).
Cannes Yachting Festival is an event for boating enthusiasts in the Vieux Port (September).
The International Actors' Performance Festival: comedy sketches and performances by fringe artists
The International Luxury Travel Market brings together under one roof the top international luxury travel providers and suppliers from all around the world.
The Global Champions Tour showjumping league has an annual event in the ports of Cannes. 
 MIPCOM and MIPTV, held in October and April respectively, the world's most important trade markets for the television industry.
 The Pan-African Film Festival, held in early April and featuring films from the African diaspora.

Economy

The area around Cannes has developed into a high-tech cluster. The technopolis of Sophia Antipolis lies in the hills beyond Cannes. The Film Festival is a major event for the industry which takes place every year during the month of May. In addition, Cannes hosts other major annual events such as the MIPIM, MIPTV, MIDEM, Cannes Lions, and the NRJ Music Awards. There is an annual television festival in the last week in September.

The economic environment is based on tourism, business fairs, trade and aviation. In 2006, 421 new companies were registered.

Cannes hosts the Cannes Mandelieu Space Center, headquarters of Thales Alenia Space, the first European satellite manufacturer.

Sport
Cannes is home to the football side AS Cannes, which currently plays in the French third division. The club is notable for having launched the professional career of Zinedine Zidane.

The city hosts the Jumping International de Cannes international horse jumping event every June.

Cannes women's volleyball team RC Cannes has been very successful (won twenty French Championships and two CEV Champions League).

Transport
Nice Côte d'Azur Airport
Located  from Cannes, Nice Côte d'Azur Airport has close to 10 million passengers a year. The smaller Cannes – Mandelieu Airport is nearby.
CannesExpress operate a regular door-to-door airport shuttle service between Nice Airport and hotels/accommodations in Cannes. Price per seat is 20 Euros.

Rail
Cannes station is the main railway station for the city of Cannes. It is situated on the Marseille–Ventimiglia railway.

There are several rail services including:
TGVs from Paris Gare de Lyon to Nice,
a TER from Marseille St Charles to Nice,
a TER service from Cannes to Les Arcs,
a TER service from Grasse/Cannes to Ventimiglia (Italy),
and an occasional Thello (Italian train) from Marseille St Charles to Milan.

Cannes-la-Bocca station is both a passenger station and a goods/maintenance depot. It is situated alongside the beach and a connection to local ferries. There are three more stations on the line to Grasse: Le Bosquet, La Frayère and Ranguin.

Bus
Coach services arrive at the Gare Routière de Cannes, in the centre of the city, near the Town Hall. Companies from abroad include Eurolines and Agence Phocéens. Regional services are by Rapides Côte d'Azur and CTM, with services from Nice and Grasse/Mandelieu respectively. Local bus services are provided by Bus Azur.

Ferry
Ferries are available in Nice harbour from Bastia and Calvi in Corsica, with services provided by SNCM Ferryterranée and Corsica Ferries. From Bastia, the journey is 4 hours, 45 minutes on conventional ferries and 3 hours, 40 minutes on express ferries, while from Calvi, conventional vessels take 3 hours, 45 minutes and express vessels take 2 hours, 45 minutes. An average of four ferries a day sail on these routes, with more during summer.

The Port
Cannes has 2 marinas – Vieux Port de Cannes (with 800 berths up to 145 m in length) beside the Palais des Festivals and Port Pierre Canto at the far end of the Croisette. Vieux Port is the main port and used for cruise stopovers and yacht charters.

International relations

Cannes is twinned with:

Cannes has friendship pacts with:

Notable people

Public service 

 Dante Livio Bianco (1909–1953), Italian civil lawyer and wartime partisan leader. 
 Anne Spoerry (1918–1999), French-Kenyan doctor and pilot
 Karan Singh (born 1931), former ruler of Jammu and Kashmir, Indian diplomat and politician
 Infanta Pilar, Duchess of Badajoz (1936–2020), Spanish royal and Grandee of Spain
 Jean-Charles Terrassier (1940–2022), psychologist, specialized in childhood intellectual giftedness
 Norbert Turini (born 1954), prelate of the Catholic Church, archbishop of Montpellier. 
 Catherine Guillouard (born 1965), CEO of RATP Group, state-owned public transport operator

The Arts 

 Amédée de Vallombrosa (1880–1968), classical organist
 Gérard Philipe (1922–1959), theater and film actor
 Claude Mercier-Ythier (1931–2020), a French harpsichord maker
 James de Beaujeu Domville (1933–2015), theatrical producer and Commissioner of the National Film Board of Canada.
 Gabriel Tacchino (born 1934), a French classical pianist and piano teacher.
 Vojislav Stanimirovic (1937–2022), reformed criminal, writer, journalist and artist
 Jean-Jacques Kantorow (born 1945), violinist and conductor
 Jacques Israelievitch (1948–2015), a French violinist
 Paolo Barzman (born 1957), French-American film director
 Frédéric Boyer (born 1961), author of novels, poems and essays 
 Cécilia Cara (born 1984), a French actress and singer

Sport 

 Bernard Casoni (born 1961), a former footballer with 488 club caps and 30 for France
 Yann Bonato (born 1972), basketball player
 Johan Micoud (born 1973), footballer with 485 club caps and 17 for France
 Sébastien Vieilledent (born 1976), rower and gold medallist at the Rowing at the 2004 Summer Olympics – Men's double sculls
 Sarah Bouhaddi (born 1986), footballer with over 300 club caps and 149 for France women
 Anthony Modeste, (born 1988), football player with over 400 club caps
 Tony Ramoin (born 1988), snowboarder, bronze medallist at the 2010 Winter Olympics.
 Élodie Lorandi (born 1989), a swimmer and medallist at the 2008 and 2012 Summer Paralympics
 Johann Zarco (born 1990), Grand Prix motorcycle racer
 Norman Nato (born 1992), racing driver
 Brandon Maïsano (born 1993), racing driver
 Dylan Bronn (born 1995) a footballer with over 200 club caps and 35 for Tunisia 
 Timothé Luwawu-Cabarrot (born 1995), NBA player 
 Dorian Boccolacci (born 1998), racing driver

Died in Cannes 

 Henry Brougham, 1st Baron Brougham and Vaux (1778–1868), British statesman & Lord Chancellor.
 Charles Grant, 1st Baron Glenelg (1778–1866), a Scottish politician and colonial administrator.
 Victor Cousin (1792–1867), a French philosopher, founded "eclecticism".
 Jean-Baptiste Dumas (1800–1884), a French chemist, worked on organic analysis and synthesis.
 Prosper Mérimée (1803–1870), a French Romanticism writer.
 Alexis de Tocqueville (1805–1859), aristocrat, diplomat, political scientist & philosopher and historian.
 Louis Blanc (1811–1882), a French socialist politician and historian.  
 Sir Monier Monier-Williams (1819–1899), an Oxford scholar who taught Asian languages.
 John Francis Campbell (1821–1885), a Scottish author and scholar.
 Sir Henry James Sumner Maine (1822–1888), a British Whig comparative jurist and historian.
 Charilaos Trikoupis (1832–1896), Greek politician, Prime Minister of Greece seven times, 1875–1895.
 Spencer Cavendish, 8th Duke of Devonshire (1833–1908), a British statesman.
 Benjamin Godard (1849–1895), a French violinist and Romantic-era composer.
 Nubar Gulbenkian (1896–1972), Armenian business magnate and socialite
 Jacques Monod (1910–1976), French microbiologist and biochemist, Nobel prizewinner

Gallery

See also
Communes of the Alpes-Maritimes department

References

Further reading
Published in the 19th century

Published in the 20th century

External links

 
 The City Hall official website 
 Cannes Tourist Office official website 
 Cannes Film Festival official website 
 Cannes Today guide 

 
Communes of Alpes-Maritimes
French Riviera